The Morettische Opernhaus (also Moretti-Theater) was the most frequently performed opera house in Dresden from the end of the 18th century, in the era of Carl Maria von Weber and until the construction of the first Königliches Hoftheater Dresden.

History 
From 1664 to 1667 a first opera house had been built in Dresden near the castle (Opernhaus am Taschenberg near the Zwingers). In 1719 the Opernhaus am Zwinger followed. In the middle of the 18th century, the impresario Pietro Moretti, who was a guest in Dresden, was granted the privilege of building a "standing theatre" here. In 1761, after Moretti had made an interim guest appearance in Margravial Opera House in Bayreuth, it was rebuilt in stone.

In 1780, it was designated a court theatre, but only as the small court theatre, as the existing theatre at the Zwinger was significantly larger.

The Moretti Theatre had a floor plan of about 40×17 metres and had three tiers with initially 350 seats; in 1783 it was expanded to accommodate an audience of about 800.

The troupes of Joseph Seconda, Johann Gottlieb Naumann and later also Ferdinando Paër, Francesco Morlacchi and finally Weber and Carl Gottlieb Reissiger worked in this theatre and the one on the Lincke’sches Bad. In 1829, the violin virtuoso Paganini made a guest appearance at the Moretti Opera House.

After the new Königliches Hoftheater Dresden was opened on 13 April 1841, after only three years of construction, Weber's Jubel-Ouvertüre and Goethe's play Torquato Tasso had been inaugurated, the Morettisches Opernhaus was demolished.

Premiere 
 Francesco Morlacchi: Il barbiere di Siviglia, April 1816.

Hofkapellmeister 
Important composers worked as conductors at the Dresden Court Opera of that time:
 Johann Gottlieb Naumann (1741–1801)
 Ferdinando Paër (1771–1839, 1802–1806)
 Francesco Morlacchi (1784–1841, italienisches Operndepartement 1811–1841)
 Carl Maria von Weber (1786–1826, deutsches Operndepartement 1817–1826)
 Carl Gottlieb Reissiger (1798–1859, 1826–1859)

Singers 
 Friederike Funk
 Wilhelmine Schröder-Devrient

References

External links 
 Morettisches Opernhaus (Dresden)
 Umbauprojekt 1751
 Grundriss von 1751
 Ulrich Rosseaux: Freiräume: Unterhaltung, Vergnügen und Erholung in Dresden 1694–1830
 H. J. Haupt: Die große Bühne der Stadt Dresden

Opera houses in Germany
1750s architecture
Buildings and structures demolished in the 1840s
Culture in Dresden
Demolished buildings and structures in Germany